Lactarius lignyotus is a member of the large milk-cap genus Lactarius in the order Russulales. It was first described scientifically by Elias Magnus Fries in 1855. It is considered edible, but of little interest.

See also
List of Lactarius species

References

External links

lignyotus
Fungi of Europe
Fungi described in 1855
Taxa named by Elias Magnus Fries